John Dennis Geoghegan (December 25, 1842 – June 22, 1896) was an American politician in the state of Washington. He served in the Washington House of Representatives from 1889 to 1891.

References

Republican Party members of the Washington House of Representatives
1896 deaths
1842 births
Irish emigrants to the United States (before 1923)
19th-century American politicians